Miss Japan 2019 was the 45th edition of the Miss Japan pageant. It was held on September 11, 2019. The winner was Honoka Tsuchiya of Tokyo Prefecture. The is the first edition of the Miss Japan pageant under the HDR corporation, who started the pageant after the HDR corporation lost the franchises to Miss Universe and Miss Earth. Representatives from 42 out of the 47 prefectures of Japan competed at the pageant.

Results

Placements

Contestants 
42 contestants competed:

Notes

Did not compete

References

External links

2019
Beauty pageants in Japan
Japanese awards
2019 beauty pageants
September 2019 events in Japan